Longir-e Vosta (also Romanized as Longīr-e Vosţá and Longīr-e Vostá; also known as Longīr-e Mīānī) is a village in Dorunak Rural District, Zeydun District, Behbahan County, Khuzestan Province, Iran. At the 2006 census, its population was 552, in 118 families.

References 

Populated places in Behbahan County